Advanced Placement (AP) World History: Modern (also known as just AP World History, AP World, or WHAP) is a college-level course and examination offered to high school students in the United States through the College Board's Advanced Placement program designed to help students develop a greater understanding of the evolution of global processes and contacts as well as interactions between different human societies. The course advances this understanding through a combination of selective factual knowledge and appropriate analytical skills.

Course 
Students used to study all prehistory and history, especially from 8000 BC to the present day. However, it was announced in July 2018 that the test would be changed to an AP World History: Modern exam that only contains content since 1200 CE, starting in the 2019–2020 school year, with plans for a new course that's about the time before called AP World History: Ancient. Students in the United States usually take the course in their sophomore year of high school, although they are not generally required to do so.

The course is currently organized around four eras/periods and nine units:
Period 1 - c. 1200 to c. 1450

Unit 1: The Global Tapestry

Unit 2: Networks of Exchange

Period 2 - c. 1450 to c. 1750

Unit 3: Land-Based Empires

Unit 4: Transoceanic Interconnections

Period 3 - c. 1750 to c. 1900

Unit 5: Revolutions

Unit 6: Consequences of Industrialization

Period 4 - c. 1900 to the present

Unit 7: Global Conflict

Unit 8: Cold War and Decolonization

Unit 9: Globalization

Exam

The first section of the AP World History exam consists of 55 multiple choice questions with a 55-minute time limit. The questions are not divided up evenly between the 9 units.

While previously the exam deducted 1/4 of a point for every incorrect answer, from 2011 onwards the penalty for incorrect answers has been removed. The number of multiple choice options is being reduced from five to four at the same time.

The AP World History exam was first administered in 2002. The test underwent a major overhaul for the 2017 exam, however, due to the prodigious number of students that struggled with the free response section, the College Board decided to initiate yet another round of sweeping reform, to be put in effect in May 2018. Currently it has the same format as Advanced Placement United States History and Advanced Placement European History. The exam features a new section (Section I Part B) that requires three short answer questions, one of which is selected from two options. Each question has three parts, making for a total of 9 parts within the SAQ section. Students have forty minutes to answer these, and they count for twenty percent of the exam score.

Section II lasts for a total of 100 minutes, and it includes a document-based question (DBQ) and a long essay question (LEQ). Students are allowed to work on either essay within this total time period. The section begins with a 15-minute reading period where students are advised to read both the documents for DBQ. However, students may begin writing during this time; most students take notes on the documents in order to plan out the DBQ. Students are advised to spend 45 minutes writing the DBQ and then 40 writing the LEQ, but there are no rules on when each essay must be worked on. There are three prompts for the LEQ, but only one needs to be chosen. Each LEQ prompt addresses a different period, with one addressing periods 1 & 2, another addressing periods 3 & 4, and a third addressing periods 5 & 6.

The DBQ accounts for 25% of the total exam score, and the LEQ is 15%. The essays are graded out of seven points and six points, respectively. Students are required to analyze and synthesize the sourcing documents of the DBQ, but some outside information is still needed. The LEQ only provides a prompt and no sort of stimulus, so a large amount of outside information is necessary.

Grade distribution 

In 2012, the head of AP Grading, Trevor Packer, stated that the reason for the low percentages of 5s is that "AP World History is a college-level course, & many sophomores aren't yet writing at that level." 10.44 percent of all seniors who took the exam in 2012 received a 5, while just 6.62 percent of sophomores received a 5.

References

External links
 AP World History at CollegeBoard.com
 AP World History Study Guide on Albert
 
http://apcentral.collegeboard.com/apc/members/exam/exam_information/2090.html
 AP World History: Course and Exam Description

History education
Advanced Placement